Amicie is a French feminine given name.

FPeople with the name 
 Amicie de Courtenay
 Amicie de Montfort

References 

French feminine given names